One Two Bato, Three Four Bapor is a 1988 Filipino comedy-drama film co-written and directed by Ben Feleo and starring Sheryl Cruz, Romnick Sarmenta, Eddie Garcia, Sylvia La Torre, Romy Diaz, Ian Veneracion, Harlene Bautista, Michael Locsin, and child actors Richard Gutierrez, and Raymond Gutierrez. Produced by Seiko Films, it was released on December 14, 1988. Critic Lav Diaz gave the film a mixed review, commending its honest focus on street children in the Philippines, while criticizing its commercial tendencies and implausible situations.

Cast

Main cast
Sheryl Cruz
Romnick Sarmenta
Eddie Garcia
Sylvia La Torre
Romy Diaz
Ian Veneracion
Harlene Bautista
Michael Locsin
Richard Gutierrez as Richie
Raymond Gutierrez as Amboy
Mon Alvir

Supporting cast
Bomber Moran
Metring David
Matutina
Fred Moro
Whitney Tyson
Dinky Doo Jr.
Ros Olgado
Ike Lozada
Don Pepot
Fatima Alvir
Caselyn Francisco
Patrick Cruz
Reggie Javier
Apple de Guzman
Guio Alvarez
Guila Alvarez
Maricar Itable
Emil Martin
Abba Revilla
Arjay Larvan
Cante Castro

Release
One Two Bato was rated "B" by the Movie and Television Review and Classification Board (MTRCB), indicating a "Good" quality. The film was released by Seiko Films on December 14, 1988, with free Seiko Wallets handed out to early first-day viewers.

Critical response
Lav Diaz, writing for the Manila Standard, gave the film a mixed review; though he commended the film's truthful focus on street children in the Philippines, he criticized it as leaning excessively into commercialism and fantastical situations. Giving examples, Diaz was displeased with a scene involving the child actors doing a Hawaiian dance, which he noted was well liked by audiences ("you understood why there are so many crazy people in our midst"), and he questioned how the separated twin brothers in the film were able to convincingly switch places and fool their families when they were only five years old.

See also
The Prince and the Pauper

References

External links

1988 films
1988 comedy films
1988 comedy-drama films
Filipino-language films
Films about adoption
Films about Filipino families
Films about twin brothers
Philippine comedy films
Seiko Films films
Films directed by Ben Feleo